Ahmet Turgay Uzer is a Turkish-born American theoretical physicist and nature photographer.

Regents' Professor Emeritus at Georgia Institute of Technology following Joseph Ford (physicist). He has contributed in the field of atomic and molecular physics, nonlinear dynamics and chaos significantly. His research on interplay between quantum dynamics
and classical mechanics, in the context of chaos is considered to be novel in molecular and theoretical physics and chemistry.

Academic career 

Turgay Uzer completed his bachelor's degree at Turkey's prestigious Middle East Technical University. According to Harvard University Library his doctoral thesis was entitled "Photon and electron interactions with diatomic molecules." He defended his dissertation and graduated from Harvard University in 1979.

Before joining Georgia Tech in 1985 as an associate professor, he worked as a research fellow at University of Oxford 1979/81, Caltech 1982/1983, and as a research associate at University of Colorado 1983/85. Currently, he is a faculty member with the Center for Nonlinear Science and
full professor of physics at Georgia Tech.

His research areas are quite broad, but he has focused on the dynamics of intermolecular energy transfer, reaction dynamics, quantal manifestations of classical mechanics, quantization of nonlinear systems, computational physics, molecular physics, applied mathematics.

Awards 

Uzer was Alexander von Humboldt-Stiftung Foundation Fellow in 1993–1994 at
Max Planck Institute, Munich.

Uzer is of Turkish origin and was also awarded the prestigious Science award for his contributions to physics from the Scientific and Technological Research Council (TÜBİTAK)  in 1998.

Selected publications

Books
 The Physics and Chemistry of Wave Packets, with John Yeazell at books.google
 Lecture Notes on Atomic and Molecular Physics with Şakir Erkoç at books.google

Some of the seminal papers

Uzer has more than 80 referenced Journal articles, in a number of highly respected scientific journals.
 appeared in PRE Chaotic billiards with neutral boundaries
 appeared in Science Celestial Mechanics on a Microscopic Scale
 appeared in JCP Quantization with operators appropriate to shapes of trajectories and classical perturbation theory

References

External links
 Georgia Tech Homepage
 Physics Professor Turgay Uzer has been named Regents-reception

Turkish physicists
21st-century American physicists
Turkish chemists
Turkish mathematicians
Turkish academics
Turkish emigrants to the United States
Atomic, molecular, and optical physics
Georgia Tech faculty
Harvard University alumni
Living people
Theoretical physicists
Computational chemists
American academics of Turkish descent
1952 births
Fellows of the American Physical Society